Silverstone's poison frog (Ameerega silverstonei; formerly Epipedobates silverstonei) is a species of frog in the family Dendrobatidae endemic to Peru. Its natural habitats are subtropical or tropical moist lowland forests and rivers.

Description
The head has a rounded sloping snout and is as wide as the body. Males have a small vocal sac in the throat. The skin of the head, fore limbs and underparts is smooth while that of the dorsal surface and hind limbs is granular. The fingers are flattened and have expanded discs at their tips. There is no webbing between the digits of either hands or feet. The head and back of this frog is orange-red, sometimes with black spots or mottling, especially towards the rear. The hind limbs are largely black and the forelimbs and underparts vary in colour, sometimes being black and sometimes orange. The palms of the hands and feet and the underside of the digits are grey or orange.

Distribution
Silverstone's poison frog is endemic to Peru. Its range is not precisely known and might be wider than is thought. It has also been introduced to the vicinity of Tarapoto in the San Martín Region but the result of this introduction is unknown.

Biology
Silverstone's poison frog is a terrestrial species that is found among the leaf litter of the forest floor in tropical montane forests. Males are territorial during the breeding season and call to attract females. The eggs are laid in small clutches of about thirty eggs in a closely packed single layer underneath leaves. The male guards them till they hatch. He then carries them on his back to a suitable ephemeral pool or water-filled crevice where the tadpoles develop until undergoing metamorphosis. The bright colors of this frog probably deter potential predators and this frog is known to be distasteful to snakes.

References

Ameerega
Amphibians of Peru
Amphibians described in 1979
Endemic fauna of Peru
Endangered animals
Taxonomy articles created by Polbot